Frederick "Fred" Goodfellow ( – third ¼ 1925) was a rugby union and professional rugby league footballer who played in the 1890s through to the 1920s.

Background
Fred Goodfellow died aged 46 in Wakefield, West Riding of Yorkshire, England.

Playing career
Fred Goodfellow won caps for Yorkshire (RU) against Northumberland and Lancashire during 1897, followed by further caps during 1898.

Genealogical information
Fred Goodfellow's marriage took place during fourth ¼ 1902 in Wakefield district, he was the father of the rugby league footballer; Herbert Goodfellow.

Note
Fred Goodfellow is occasionally named as F. J. Goodfellow, but he appears to have had no middle-name, so the middle-initial of J. appears to be erroneous.

References

External links
Search for "Goodfellow" at rugbyleagueproject.org
(archived by web.archive.org) Stats – PastPlayers – "G" at hullfc.com
(archived by archive.is) Stats – PastPlayers – "G" at hullfc.com
Search for "Fred Goodfellow" at britishnewspaperarchive.co.uk
Search for "Frederick Goodfellow" at britishnewspaperarchive.co.uk

1925 deaths
Dewsbury Rams players
English rugby league players
English rugby union players
Hull F.C. players
Holbeck F.C. players
Place of birth missing
Rugby league wingers
Rugby league centres
Year of birth missing
Yorkshire rugby league team players